Charles Edelstenne (born 9 January 1938) is the general manager of Dassault Group. He was the CEO of  Dassault Aviation until replaced by Éric Trappier in 2013, and he is also the chairman of Dassault Systèmes.

Trained as a French chartered accountant, he joined Dassault Aviation, then called Avions Marcel Dassault-Breguet Aviation in 1960 as chief financial officer (CFO). In 1975, he became general secretary of Dassault, then vice president in 1986. He replaced Serge Dassault as Dassault CEO in 2000. From 1993 to 2002, he was chairman and CEO of Dassault Systèmes. Since he became CEO of Dassault Aviation, he resigned as CEO of Dassault Systèmes but remains its chairman.

He was president of the French GIFAS (Groupement des Industries Françaises Aéronautiques et Spatiales) from 2005 to 2009, followed by Jean-Paul Herteman.

He and his family own just over 6% of Dassault Systèmes' capital.

References

1938 births
Businesspeople in aviation
Dassault Group
Living people
Businesspeople from Paris
French accountants
Chief financial officers
French chief executives
French billionaires